David Schulner is an American television writer and producer. His production company is Mount Moriah. The company signed an overall deal with Universal Television.

Television filmography

Producer 
 What About Brian (2006) 
 Desperate Housewives (2004)

Writer 
 New Amsterdam (2018–2023)
 Reverie (2018)
 Do No Harm (2013)
 The Event (2010–2011)
 Kings (2009)
 The Oaks (2008) 
 Tell Me You Love Me (2007) 
 Desperate Housewives (2005) 
 Miss Match (2003–2004) 
 Everwood (2003)
 MDs (2002) 
 Once and Again (1999)

Showrunner
 Emerald City (2017)

References

External links 
 

American soap opera writers
American male television writers
Living people
American television producers
Year of birth missing (living people)